Viktor Maksimovich Shishkin (born February 8, 1955, in Sverdlovsk) is a retired Soviet football player and a Russian football coach.

Honours
 Soviet Top League winner: 1982.

International career
Shishkin played his only game for USSR on March 28, 1984, in a friendly against West Germany.

External links 
  Profile

1955 births
Living people
Soviet footballers
Soviet Union international footballers
Soviet Top League players
FC Dinamo Minsk players
FC Ural Yekaterinburg players
FC Lokomotiv Moscow players
FC Tyumen players
Russian football managers
FC Ural Yekaterinburg managers
Russian Premier League managers
Sportspeople from Yekaterinburg
Association football midfielders
Association football defenders
FC Uralets Nizhny Tagil players